Florida's 11th Senate District elects one member of the Florida Senate. The district consists of Citrus, Hernando, Sumter counties and part of Pasco county in the U.S. state of Florida. The current Senator is Republican Blaise Ingoglia.

List of senators 
NOTE: The following Information was gathered from the Florida Senate website. Only records of senators from 1998-present are kept.

Elections 
NOTE: The following results were gathered from the Florida Department of State. Uncontested election results are not provided.

1978

1980

1982

1984

1992

1996

2000

2002

2004

2008

2012

2016

2020

2022

References 

Florida Senate districts